Juan Bautista Arricau (born 1 April 1998) is an Argentine professional footballer who plays as a forward for Comunicaciones.

Club career
Arricau is a product of Vélez Sarsfield's youth ranks, having joined in 2012. He started his senior career in Primera B Metropolitana with Comunicaciones, signing in February 2019. He made his bow in an away fixture with UAI Urquiza, featuring for the full duration of a 0–1 win on 11 February; Walter Zermatten selected him in three others matches that month.

International career
Arricau received call-ups to the Argentina U17s during his youth career, notably featuring in a friendly with Chile U17 on 26 July 2014.

Career statistics
.

References

External links

1998 births
Living people
Sportspeople from Buenos Aires Province
Argentine footballers
Argentina youth international footballers
Association football forwards
Primera B Metropolitana players
Club Comunicaciones footballers